The 2020 Drake Bulldogs football team represented Drake University as a member of the Pioneer Football League (PFL) during the 2020–21 NCAA Division I FCS football season. The season was suspended in the fall of 2020 because of the COVID-19 pandemic and played in the spring of 2021. Led by second-year head coach Todd Stepsis, the Bulldogs compiled an overall record of 2–3 with an identical mark in conference play, placing fifth in the PFL. The team played its home games at Drake Stadium in Des Moines, Iowa.

Previous season

The Bulldogs finished the 2019 season 6–5, 6–2 in PFL play to finish in a tie for second place.

Schedule
Drake had a game scheduled against  on September 3, which was later canceled before the start of the 2020 season. A replacement game, scheduled for the same day, was announced against  on July 14. On July 27, that replacement game, along with Drake's scheduled games against North Dakota State and Dixie State, were canceled due to the Pioneer Football League's decision to play a conference-only schedule due to the COVID-19 pandemic. In August, the entire schedule was pushed to spring due to the pandemic. On December 17, the PFL announced its revised spring football season schedule, which included Presbyterian, who were originally not scheduled to move into the PFL until the 2021–22 season.

Following the decisions by Marist and Dayton to opt out of a spring season, the PFL released another schedule in February 2021.

References

Drake
Drake Bulldogs football seasons
Drake Bulldogs football